Clepsis aerosana is a species of moth of the family Tortricidae. It is found in China (Xinjiang), Mongolia and Russia.

The wingspan is 22–27 mm. Adults have been recorded on wing from June to July.

References

Moths described in 1853
Clepsis